Trelawny of the Wells is a 1916 British silent romance film directed by Cecil Hepworth, and starring Alma Taylor, Stewart Rome, and Violet Hopson. It is an adaptation of the 1898 play Trelawny of the Wells by Arthur Wing Pinero. The story was later filmed as a late silent by MGM in 1928 under the title The Actress, starring Norma Shearer.

Cast
 Alma Taylor - Rose Trelawny
 Stewart Rome - Tom Wrench
 Violet Hopson - Imogen Parrott
 Lionelle Howard - Arthur Gower
 John MacAndrews - James Telfer
 Warwick Buckland - Sir William Gower
 Gwynne Herbert - Trafalgar Gower
 Marguerite Blanche - Claire de Foenix
 Percy Manton - Captain de Foenix
 William Felton - Ablett
 Ivy Millais - Sarah
 Amy Lorraine - Mrs Telfer
 Johnny Butt - Augustus Colpoys
 Bob Bouchier - Hallkeeper
 Sybil Coventry - Mrs Mossup

References

External links

1916 films
Films directed by Cecil Hepworth
Films about theatre
1910s romance films
British romance films
British films based on plays
British silent feature films
Films set in London
Hepworth Pictures films
British black-and-white films
1910s English-language films
1910s British films
English-language romance films